is a train station in Nagata-ku, Kobe, Hyōgo Prefecture, Japan.

Lines 
Kobe Municipal Subway
Kaigan Line Station K09

Gallery 

Stations of Kobe Municipal Subway
Railway stations in Hyōgo Prefecture
Railway stations in Japan opened in 2001